Herale is a district situated in the central Galgaduud province of Somalia. The district is primarily inhabited by  surre clan specifically the Fiqi Mohamed The District,Herale is located near the border with Ethiopia

References

Populated places in Galguduud